Evanssellus is a genus of mites in the family Ologamasidae. There are at least two described species in Evanssellus.

Species
These two species belong to the genus Evanssellus:
 Evanssellus foliatus Ryke, 1961
 Evanssellus medusa (Lee, 1967)

References

Ologamasidae